Ike Uzoma (born February 5, 1978 in Lagos, Nigeria) is a former Nigerian footballer who played for clubs of Nigeria, Uruguay, Mexico, Chile and Kuwait.

Teams
  Stella Club 1996-1999
  Huracán Buceo 1999-2000
  Rangers 2001
  Cruz Azul Hidalgo 2002-2004
  Al-Salmiyah 2004-2005

References

 Profile at BDFA 
 Profile at Tenfield Digital 

1978 births
Living people
Nigerian footballers
Nigerian expatriate footballers
Huracán Buceo players
Al Salmiya SC players
Rangers de Talca footballers
Chilean Primera División players
Expatriate footballers in Chile
Expatriate footballers in Mexico
Expatriate footballers in Uruguay
Expatriate footballers in Kuwait
Nigerian expatriate sportspeople in Chile
Nigerian expatriate sportspeople in Mexico
Nigerian expatriate sportspeople in Uruguay
Nigerian expatriate sportspeople in Kuwait
Association footballers not categorized by position
Kuwait Premier League players